Lumbin is a commune in the Isère department in southeastern France.

Population

Twin towns
Lumbin is twinned with:

  Vipava, Vipava, Slovenia, since 2005

See also
Communes of the Isère department
 Funiculaire de Saint-Hilaire du Touvet

References

Communes of Isère
Isère communes articles needing translation from French Wikipedia